Yambo may refer to:

Yambo Ouologuem (1940–2017), Malian writer
Yambo (writer), Italian writer born Enrico Novelli
Yambo, Burkina Faso
Yanbu' al Bahr, a Saudi Red Sea port
Yambo Records, a recording label
Yambo, a trivia game played by guests of The Late Late Show with Craig Kilborn
YAMBO code, a scientific software package (computational physics/chemistry)